Growth regulation by estrogen in breast cancer 1 is a protein that in humans is encoded by the GREB1 gene.

Function 

This gene is an estrogen-responsive gene that is an early response gene in the estrogen receptor-regulated pathway. It is thought to play an important role in hormone-responsive tissues and cancer. Three alternatively spliced transcript variants encoding distinct isoforms have been found for this gene.

References

Further reading